Cleidogona is a genus of millipedes in the family Cleidogonidae. There are more than 100 described species in Cleidogona.

See also
 List of Cleidogona species

References

Further reading

 
 

Chordeumatida
Articles created by Qbugbot